Elwin Nelson "Doc" Romnes (January 1, 1907 – July 21, 1984) was an American ice hockey player and coach. He played professionally in the National Hockey League (NHL) with the Chicago Black Hawks, Toronto Maple Leafs, and New York Americans from 1930 to 1940. He won the Lady Byng Trophy in 1935–36 for sportsmanship and gentlemanly play, and with Chicago won the Stanley Cup twice, in 1934 and 1938.

Following his player career, Romnes was head coach of the Michigan Tech Huskies from 1941 to 1945 (including two years when the program was suspended during World War II), and the Minnesota Golden Gophers from 1947 until 1952. He as inducted into the United States Hockey Hall of Fame in 1973.

Career statistics

Regular season and playoffs

Head coaching record

Awards and achievements
1936 Lady Byng Trophy winner
1934 Stanley Cup  (Chicago Black Hawks)
1938 Stanley Cup  Championship  (Chicago Black Hawks)

References

External links
 

1907 births
1984 deaths
American men's ice hockey centers
Chicago Blackhawks players
Ice hockey coaches from Minnesota
Ice hockey players from Minnesota
Lady Byng Memorial Trophy winners
London Tecumsehs players
Michigan Tech Huskies men's ice hockey coaches
Minnesota Golden Gophers men's ice hockey coaches
New York Americans players
Omaha Knights (AHA) players
Pittsburgh Yellow Jackets (IHL) players
Sportspeople from White Bear Lake, Minnesota
Stanley Cup champions
Toronto Maple Leafs players
United States Hockey Hall of Fame inductees